Little Cumbrae or Little Cumbrae Island is an island in the Firth of Clyde, in North Ayrshire, Scotland. The island is known locally as Wee Cumbrae.

Etymology
The Gaelic name Cumaradh means "place of the Cymric people", referring to the Brittonic-speaking inhabitants of the Kingdom of Strathclyde. Alternatively, the name Cumbrae may derive from Kil Maura meaning "cell or church of a female saint".

Little Cumbrae was recorded as Kumbrey circa 1300, Cumbraye circa 1330 and Litill Comeray in 1515 and was also formerly known as Little or Wee Cumray.

The Cumbraes are referred to as the Kumreyiar in the Norse Saga of Haakon Haakonarson.

Geography

Little Cumbrae lies barely a kilometre to the south of its larger neighbour, Great Cumbrae, a few kilometres distant from the mainland town of Largs. The islands are collectively referred to as The Cumbraes. In stark contrast to its neighbour, green and fertile Great Cumbrae, Little Cumbrae is a rough and rocky island. With its many cliffs and rocky outcrops, Little Cumbrae bears more of a resemblance to a Hebridean island than to some of its neighbours in the Clyde.

A number of uninhabited islets skirt the island's east coast, Castle Isle, the Broad Islands and Trail Isle.

Today the island's main settlement is at Little Cumbrae House on the eastern shore, facing the Scottish mainland.

Geology
Unlike its larger neighbour, Little Cumbrae is formed almost entirely from extrusive igneous rocks. These are a mix of Carboniferous age basalts, mugearite and hawaiite lava flows cut by a similarly aged WSW-ENE aligned dyke of alkali olivine diorite. A later northwest–southeast aligned swarm of dykes of Palaeogene age intrude these rocks whilst several geological faults run generally NW-SE.
There are limited outcrops of sedimentary rock in the east, these being of the Eileans Sandstone assigned to the Clyde Sandstone Formation of the Carboniferous age Inverclyde Group.
A raised beach is developed along the lower-lying east coast of the island on which have accumulated marine deposits and blown sand. Glacial striations betray the broadly north–south movement of a glacier over the island during the last ice age. Small pockets of peat have accumulated during the post-glacial period.

History

The Cumbraes were one of the remote locations that early Irish monks settled. There are six or more known caves on the island. A submarine passage was said to run from Monks' Cave (now known as Kings Cave) at Storrils cliff to Kingarth on the Isle of Bute.

Walter Stewart is said to have built a castle or hunting lodge on Little Cumbrae.  His son, Robert II spent time there hunting the deer, however the site of the "Auld Castle" is unknown. It was occupied during hunting expeditions by Robert II in 1375 and 1384, and was demolished by Cromwell's soldiers in 1653.

Little Cumbrae Castle, a small square keep, was built in the 16th century on Castle Island off Little Cumbrae. It was similarly occupied.

In the early 20th century, under the ownership of Evelyn Stuart Parker, a new 'mansion house' was created from the original single storey farmhouse, the gardens were laid out to a plan by Gertrude Jekyll, the renowned garden designer, and substantial repairs were undertaken to the castle and the original lighthouse. The original work commenced in 1913, with subsequent alterations made between 1926 and 1929 when the square tower and top floor were added.

Little Cumbrae is the birthplace of James Archbald, the first mayor of Carbondale, Pennsylvania.

Cumbrae Lighthouses
James Ewing built the first Little Cumbrae lighthouse on the top of Lighthouse Hill in 1757. This was the second lighthouse in Scotland. An open coal fire was lit at the top of a circular stone tower. Remains of this old structure can still be seen and are designated a scheduled monument.

The traditional Cumbrae Lighthouse was designed and built in 1793 by Thomas Smith under commission from the Commissioners of the Northern Lights. The lighthouse lies on a broad raised beach on the western shore of the island looking out into the Firth, 0.5 km from the first light. It had a foghorn, slipway, jetty, and boathouse. The original oil lamps were replaced by Argand lamps in 1826. In 1865, the foghorn was installed; the first in Britain. The tower was restored in 1956 and a solar-powered light was installed in 1974. The 1793 tower has been unused since 1997, with the light on a  hexagonal/cylindrical tower adjacent to the old generator house.

Ownership
Little Cumbrae was privately purchased in 2003 and there were plans for its development as a memorial park, nature reserve and corporate escape.

The island was sold again in July 2009 for £2 million. The buyers of the island, a Scottish millionaire couple of Indian origin, Sarwan and Sunita Poddar, opened a yoga and meditation centre there with the help of yoga guru Swami Baba Ramdev. There have also been rumours of the new owners planning to rename it "Peace Island", but those have been denied.

See also

 List of islands of Scotland

Footnotes

References
 
 Johnston, J. B. (1903). Place-names of Scotland. Edinburgh: David Douglas.

External links

Pictures of lighthouse
YouTube video of Little or Wee Cumbrae island and the castle

Uninhabited islands of North Ayrshire
Islands of the Clyde
Private islands of the United Kingdom
The Cumbraes